Bhookailasa is a 1958 Indian Kannada language film directed by K. Shankar and produced by A. V. Meiyappan under the banner of AVM Productions. It stars Rajkumar, Kalyan Kumar and K. S. Ashwath in pivotal roles. The movie is a depiction of the legend prevalent in Gokarna, Karnataka and is also referred to as  Gokarna Mahakshetra. It is based on the famous Kannada stage play Bhookailasa by Sri Sahitya Samrajya Nataka Mandali of Mysore which A. V. Meiyappan had earlier adapted into the Telugu movie titled Bhookailas in 1940. A. V. Meiyappan also shot the movie simultaneously in Telugu as Bhookailas starring N. T. Rama Rao.

Cast 

 Rajkumar as Ravana
 Kalyan Kumar as Narada
 Jamuna as Mandodari
 B. Saroja Devi as Parvati
 K. S. Ashwath as Shiva
 Siddayya Swamy as Indra
 Hemalatha as Kaikase
 B. Dasappa as Mantri
 S. V. Ranga Rao as Mayasura
 R. N. Magadi as Mantri
 Master Baji as Vinayaka
 Gurusiddayya Swami as Kumbhakarna
 Y. M. Chandraiah as Vibhishana
 B. Anil Kumar as Vishnu

Soundtrack 
The music was composed by R. Sudarshanam, R. Govardhanam and all song lyrics were penned by K. R. Seetharama Sastry.

References

External links 
 

1958 films
1950s Kannada-language films
Hindu mythological films
Films directed by K. Shankar
Films based on the Ramayana
Films scored by R. Sudarsanam